Gaasperdam is a neighborhood of Amsterdam, Netherlands in the Zuidoost (southeastern) borough of the city.

Neighbourhoods of Amsterdam
Amsterdam-Zuidoost